"Yeah Yeah" is a song by Italian singer Sabrina. It was produced by Severo Lombardoni. It was released in March 1990 as the first single from Sabrina's third album Over the Pop. The song reached No. 21 in Italy.

Song information
The follow-up to "Gringo", "Yeah Yeah", was another happy-sounding dance-pop track, once again written and produced by Sabrina herself and Elvio Moratto. Lyric-wise, the song's concerns are the joys of a nice and healthy environment. "Yeah Yeah" was released as a single twice, the first release in 1990 remaining Italian-only. Three mixes were released in 1990, a 7" mix, a 12" mix and a rather spacey sounding remix (titled Ambient mix), on two formats, a 7" single and a 12" single.

In late 1990/early 1991, the Italian dance-label Discomagic released four remixes of "Yeah Yeah", on both a standard and a picture-disc 12".

The track makes use of the "Yeah! Woo!" sample from "Think (About It)" by Lyn Collins and James Brown.

Formats and track listings

1990 release
 7" Single
 "Yeah Yeah" – 4:01
 "Yeah Yeah" (dub version) – 4:01
 12" Single
 "Yeah Yeah" (12" Mix) – 5:35
 "Yeah Yeah" (Ambient Mix) – 6:16
 "Yeah Yeah" (dub version) – 4:01

1991 release
 CD single
 "Yeah Yeah" (club version) – 5:00
 "Yeah Yeah" (a cappella) – 1:26
 "Yeah Yeah" – 4:20
 "Yeah Yeah" (dub version) – 4:16
 12" single
 "Yeah Yeah" (club version) – 5:00
 "Yeah Yeah" (a cappella) – 1:26
 "Yeah Yeah" – 4:20
 "Yeah Yeah" (dub version) – 4:16

Charts

References

1990 songs
Sabrina Salerno songs
1991 singles
Casablanca Records singles
Songs written by Sabrina Salerno